Our Lady of Mount Zion College (Colegio Nuestra Señora de Montesión) was one of the first Jesuits schools in the world, founded in 1561. Today from its two locations in Palma, Majorca, Spain, it educates from primary through baccalaureate and two training cycles.

History
In 2011, Montesión celebrated the fact that it was founded 450 years ago.

During the expulsion of the Jesuits between 1767 and 1824 the Colegio de Montesión de Palma building  was used as a university from 1769-1816 and 1820-1824. Briefly in 1812 it became the Royal College of Artillery. In the second expulsion of the Jesuits between 1837 and 1919, the Balearic Institute (1837-1916) and the Public Library (1835-1855) were established in the building.

The school was the owner of the Librería Juliana, a large collection of books and manuscripts from the 17th and 18th centuries; they were seized during the Franco era The College is also noted for its collection of ceramics.

See also
 List of Jesuit sites

References  

Secondary schools in Spain
Jesuit secondary schools in Spain
Catholic schools in Spain
Educational institutions established in the 1560s